Guillem of Montcada was Bishop of Urgell and ex officio Co-Prince of Andorra (the second) from 1295 to 1308.

13th-century Princes of Andorra
14th-century Princes of Andorra
Bishops of Urgell
Year of birth missing
Year of death missing
13th-century Roman Catholic bishops in the Kingdom of Aragon
14th-century Roman Catholic bishops in the Kingdom of Aragon